"Day and Night" is a song by American R&B group Isyss featuring hip hop artist Jadakiss. The song was released as the first single for the group's debut album The Way We Do (2002). The Music Video for this song was directed by Billie Woodruff.

Track listing
12", 33 RPM, Vinyl
"Day & Night" (Album Version) - 3:51
"Day & Night" (Instrumental) - 3:43
"Day & Night" (Acapella) - 3:29
"Day & Night" (Album Version) - 3:51
"Day & Night" (Instrumental) - 3:43
"Day & Night" (Acapella) - 3:29

CD
"Day + Night (Remix)" (Full Version) - 3:13
"Single For the Rest of My Life" (Snippet) - 1:20
"Stood Up" (Snippet) - 1:23
"No Na Na" (Snippet) - 1:20
"Hater" (Snippet) - 1:30

Chart performance

Personnel
Information taken from Discogs.
associate executive production – Gerry Griffin
executive production – Billy Moss, Antonio "LA" Reid
production – Tyrice Jones
remixing – Kevin "She'kspere" Briggs

Notes

2002 singles
Jadakiss songs
2001 songs